Larchmont  is a village located within the Town of Mamaroneck in Westchester County, New York, approximately  northeast of Midtown Manhattan. The population of the village was 5,864 at the 2010 census. In February 2019, Bloomberg ranked Larchmont as the 15th wealthiest place in the United States and the third wealthiest in New York.

History

Colonial period
Originally inhabited by the Siwanoy (an Algonquian tribe), Larchmont was explored by the Dutch in 1614. In 1661, John Richbell, a merchant from Hampshire, England, traded a minimal amount of goods and trinkets with the Siwanoy in exchange for land that is today known as the Town of Mamaroneck. The purchase included three peninsulas of land that lay between the Mamaroneck River to the east and Pelham Manor to the west. The east neck is now known as Orienta while the middle neck is what is now known as Larchmont Manor. The third neck was later sold and is now known as Davenport Neck in New Rochelle. The purchase was contested by Thomas Revell who, one month following Richbell's purchase, bought the land from the Siwanoy at a higher price. Richbell petitioned Governor Stuyvesant, Director General of the Colonies of the New Netherland, and Richbell was issued the land patent in 1662. In 1664 Great Britain took control of the colonies and Richbell received an English title for his lands in 1668 whereupon he began to encourage settlement. In 1675 Richbell leased his "Middle Neck" to his brother however when he died in 1684 none of his original property remained in his name. In 1700, Samuel Palmer, who had been elected the Town's first supervisor in 1697, obtained the original leases on the "Middle Neck", and in 1722 the Palmer family obtained full title to the land which included what is now the Incorporated Village of Larchmont.

Larchmont's oldest and most historic home, the "Manor House" on Elm Avenue, was built in 1797 by Peter Jay Munro. Munro was the nephew of John Jay, the first Chief Justice of the United States Supreme Court, and was later adopted by Jay. At the beginning of the 19th century, Munro was active in the abolitionist movement, helping to found the New York State Manumission Society, along with his uncle and Alexander Hamilton. In 1795 Munro had purchased much of the land owned by Samuel Palmer and by 1828 he owned all of the "Middle Neck" south of the Post Road and much of the land north of the Post Road as well. Munro later became a lawyer with Aaron Burr's law firm and built a home in Larchmont Manor known as the Manor House. Munro's house faced towards the Boston Post Road (the back is now used as the front), which tended to generate a lot of dust in summer months. To combat this, his gardener imported a Scottish species of larch trees that were known to be fast growing. These were planted along the front of the property, eventually giving the village its name.

Summer resort
When Munro died in 1833, his son Henry inherited the property which he subsequently lost and sold at auction in 1845 to Edward Knight Collins, owner of a steamship line. By the end of the Civil War in 1865, Collins had gone bankrupt and his estate was put up for auction and purchased by Thompson J.S. Flint. Flint divided the estate into building lots and called his development company the Larchmont Manor Company. Flint converted the Munro Mansion into an inn for prospective buyers and reserved some waterfront land for use as a park for the future residents of the Manor. After 1872 the area became a popular summer resort for wealthy New Yorkers. The arrival of the New York & New Haven Railroad replaced the stagecoach and steamboat as the main mode of transportation to and from New York City, making it much easier to commute and thus, modernizing travel which ultimately helped develop much of Westchester from farmland into suburbs by the 1900s.

Establishment of village
The New York legislature created Mamaroneck as a town in 1788, which includes a part of the Village of Mamaroneck, The Village of Larchmont, and the unincorporated area in the Town of Mamaroneck. This three part division occurred in the 1890s to meet the growing demand for municipal services which the town could not provide. At the time, a town was defined as only being able to provide basic government functions leaving residents of Larchmont in need of adequate water supply, sewage disposal, garbage collection, and police and fire protection. In 1891 the residents of Larchmont Manor obtained a charter from the legislature in which they incorporated that section of Town into a village. In order to comply with a law requiring incorporated villages to have at least 300 inhabitants per square mile, the boundaries of the newly incorporated Larchmont village were expanded beyond the Manor's  to include land to its north and south of the railroad, and east to Weaver Street.

After the advent of the automobile, Larchmont quickly transitioned from a resort community into one of the earliest suburbs in the United States, catering to wealthy individuals commuting to and from New York City for work on a daily basis. Many of the Victorian "cottages" and a grand hotels (such as the Bevan House and Manor Inn) remain to this day, though these have been converted to other uses such as private residences. The Larchmont Yacht Club hosts an annual Race Week competition (2007 marked the 110th running of this event). It is adjacent to Manor Park, which was designed by Jeremiah Towle, an early summer resident of Larchmont Manor and an engineer. The Larchmont Shore Club (near the Larchmont Yacht Club) hosts an annual Swim Across America challenge, across Long Island Sound.

Larchmont and neighboring Mamaroneck and New Rochelle are noted for their significant French American populace mostly due to the French-American School of New York.

Larchmont, Los Angeles is likely named after Larchmont.

Geography

A source of confusion for non-locals is that a large portion of the area served by the Larchmont Post Office (zip code 10538) is actually not in the incorporated Village of Larchmont, but is part of the "unincorporated area" of the Town of Mamaroneck.

Demographics

As of the census of 2000, there were 6,485 people, 2,418 households, and 1,709 families residing in the village. The population density was 6,073.6 people per square mile (2,340.1/km2). There were 2,470 housing units at an average density of 2,313.3 per square mile (891.3/km2). The racial makeup of the village was 92% White, 2% African American, 0.09% Native American, 2.82% Asian, 0.08% Pacific Islander, 0.77% from other races, and 1.33% from two or more races. Hispanic or Latino of any race were 4.97% of the population.

There were 2,418 households, out of which 38.8% had children under the age of 18 living with them, 62.6% were married couples living together, 6.3% had a female householder with no husband present, and 29.3% were non-families. 25.8% of all households were made up of individuals, and 10.9% had someone living alone who was 65 years of age or older. The average household size was 2.66 and the average family size was 3.25.

In the village, the population was spread out, with 29.3% under the age of 18, 3.9% from 18 to 24, 30.1% from 25 to 44, 23.7% from 45 to 64, and 12.9% who were 65 years of age or older. The median age was 38 years. For every 100 females, there were 90.7 males. For every 100 females age 18 and over, there were 85.5 males.

According to a 2009 estimate, the median income for a household in the village was $165,375, and the median income for a family was $204,695. The per capita income for the village was $109,664. About 1.6% of families and 2.3% of the population were below the poverty line, including 1.5% of those under age 18 and 5.1% of those age 65 or over.

Education
One of the six schools of the Mamaroneck Union Free School District is located in the Village of Larchmont: Chatsworth Avenue School, which was established in 1903. Other elementary schools and the high school are in the Town of Mamaroneck: Central School, Hommocks Middle School, and Murray Avenue School.

Additionally, Saints John and Paul School is a co-educational, Roman Catholic school for grades K–8 which opened its doors in 1952. It is the parish school of Saints John and Paul Church.

Parks and recreation
Flint Park – offers a variety of sports facilities, including tennis and paddle tennis, three baseball fields, soccer fields, basketball courts, a picnic area, and a playground.
 Hommocks Park – features a pool, soccer field, baseball fields, and an ice rink where the New York Raptors play. They host an annual Thanksgiving tournament for some Special Hockey International teams. The Raptors are a special needs hockey team that formed in 1996. This is one of the home arenas the Raptors play at. They also play at Westchester Skating Academy. The rink is also home to the Mamaroneck High School hockey team and the Mamaroneck Tigers Youth Hockey Team. The rink is not only used for ice purposes, but other non ice purposes as well.
Lorenzen Park – home to village Little League and Soccer League fields.
Manor Park – situated along Long Island Sound, with walking paths and views of the water. The park is open to the public but is privately owned by the Larchmont Manor Park Society (which also maintains a beach within the park).
Pine Brook Park – a play area for young children, along with a ballfield.
Vanderburgh Park – also known as "Turtle Park", a play area for small children and toddlers.
Willow/Woodbine Park – an opportunity for observing nature along the Premium River (includes basketball courts, soccer field, and a play area for both toddlers and young children).

In popular culture

 The Book of Skulls by Robert Silverberg names Larchmont as an example of the sort of towns where affluent youths come from on a Saturday night to belittle one of the book's protagonists who lives in New York City.
 Mad Men: At 16 minutes, 6 seconds into Season 2, episode 8, Crab Colson comments to Roger Sterling et al. on how lovely it is to travel by taking a "sloop from his folks' place in Old Lyme all the way down to Larchmont for race week."
 All in the Family: Archie Bunker is stuck in an elevator with a wealthy elderly black man who states in a somewhat snobby voice, "I'm the vice chairman of the Larchmont Rotary. I live in Larchmont."
The 1983 PBS WonderWorks film How to Be a Perfect Person in Just Three Days was filmed partially in Larchmont “
 Family Guy: A flashforward shows a middle-aged Stewie going over his phone bills, and shouting out to his unseen wife, "A 20-minute call to Larchmont!? Who do we know in Larchmont?" to which she responds, "my sister-in-law".
 The Odd Couple: When Felix sells all of the furniture in the apartment to redecorate, two women show up for the sale at 12:01am. When told they must come back in the morning they lament "We came all the way from Larchmont."
 Wall Street: when Gordon Gekko and Bud Fox are in the change room of the health club, Gekko asks another member, "How's Larchmont treating you?"
 Rabbit Hole: play by David Lindsay-Abaire; set in Larchmont
 I'll Be Home for Christmas: Jonathan Taylor Thomas of Home Improvement, makes his way cross-country from California to his home in Larchmont, N.Y., at Christmas break while glued inside a Santa suit.
 Home scenes in The Smurfs starring Neil Patrick Harris were shot in Larchmont.
 The West Wing: In season 3 episode 8, when speaking with President Bartlet, Bruno Gianelli says, "When I was a teenager, I crewed Larchmont to Nassau on a  sloop called Cantice."
 Larchmont: 2016 independent feature film set in the town
 Too Big to Fail: In the book, Tim Geithner ponders accepting the offer to become the CEO of Citi while strolling in Larchmont
 The Evening News, Arthur Hailey novel, 1990: The novel's protagonist and his family lived in Larchmont, and some of the key action takes place there.
 Succession (season 2, episode 4) filmed at St John's Episcopal Church in Larchmont

Notable people

 Frederick Upham Adams, noted inventor and author
 Edward Albee, Pulitzer and Tony Award-winning playwright
 Edward Franklin Albee II, Vaudeville impresario 
 Tommy Armour, golfer who won the U.S. Open, PGA Championship, and the British Open
 Michael "Flea" Balzary, "Flea" of the Red Hot Chili Peppers, bassist
 Maurice Barrymore, actor and patriarch of the Barrymore family
 Jason Bay, a Major League Baseball player, formerly a left fielder for the New York Mets
 Arnold Bernstein, German-American shipowner
 Elizabeth Berridge, film and theatre actress
 Mario Castelnuovo-Tedesco, Italian (Jewish) composer
 Young Yang Chung, world-renowned textile scholar and founder of the Chung Young Yang Embroidery Museum at Sookmyung Women's University
 Aimee Crocker, Gilded-age era heiress, princess, Bohemian and mystic
 Agnes de Lima, journalist and writer on education
 Salvatore Di Vittorio, Italian composer and conductor
 Georgiana Drew, stage actress
 Douglas Fairbanks, actor, screenwriter, director, and producer noted for his swashbuckling roles in silent films
 Gerard Finneran, Wall Street investment banker arrested after 1995 air rage incident.
 Tom Frieden, former head of the Centers for Disease Control and Prevention
 Dan Futterman, actor and Oscar-nominated screenwriter, The Birdcage, Capote
 Michael Gargiulo, NBC New York Anchor
 Timothy Geithner, Former United States Secretary of the Treasury (2009—2013)
 D. W. Griffith, Academy Award–winning film director
 Adelaide Hall, Jazz singer and Broadway star; lived in Kilmer Road with her husband Bert Hicks between 1932 – 1936
 Erica Hill, journalist and broadcaster
 Homer Hoyt, land economist
 Michael Harrington, American socialist writer and theorist, author of The Other America
 Moss Hart, award-winning playwright
 Tor Hyams, Grammy nominated songwriter and producer. 
 Gregg Jarrett, Fox News and Court TV Anchor
 C. Paul Jennewein, sculptor
 Arshag Karagheusian, Armenian-American rug manufacturer and co-owner of A & M Karagheusian
 Jean Kerr, novelist and playwright
 Walter Kerr, writer and Pulitzer Prize-winning theater critic of The New York Times
 Marie Killilea, author best known for her books Karen and With Love From Karen
 Elizabeth Kolbert, journalist (The New Yorker) and author
 Ang Lee, Oscar-winning director
 Jasun Martz, award-winning musician who recorded with Michael Jackson, toured with Frank Zappa, and arranged the Starship #1 hit, "We Built This City".
 James McCaffrey, American actor
 Phyllis McGinley, poet and author
 Gavin McInnes, co-founder of Vice, founder of the alt-right Proud Boys group, writer and political commentator 
 Bennett Miller, American director
 George Mitchell, American actor of stage, film, and television, born in Larchmont in 1905.
 Nicholas Nassim Taleb, author of The Black Swan, Fooled by Randomness and other books
 Michael O'Keefe, actor (The Great Santini, Caddyshack, Roseanne)
 Rosselle Pekelis, Judge of the Washington Supreme Court and King County Superior Court
 Alfred E. Perlman, railroad executive, president of New York Central and Penn Central 1954-1970, lived in Larchmont during his tenure.
 Mary Pickford, Academy Award–winning actress and a co-founder of the film studio United Artists
 Martin Quigley, Jr., publisher, politician (Larchmont mayor), author, spy
 Joan Rivers, actress and comedian (may not have actually lived within the boundaries of Larchmont, but talked about the village in her early comedy routines)
 Amelia Rosselli, poet
 James Rubin, US Assistant Secretary of State for Public Affairs (1997—2000), was raised in Larchmont
 David O. Russell, award-winning movie director
 Doc Severinsen, pop and jazz trumpeter
 Lesley Jane Seymour, editor, entrepreneur
 Amy Siskind, political activist
 William Lee Stoddart, architect known mainly for hotels in the pre-World War II era
 Paul Terry, founder of Terrytoons
 Alton Tobey, artist
 George Vergara, Played with the Four Horsemen at the University of Notre Dame, Lineman on the Green Bay Packers, NCAA Referee, NFL Referee, Mayor of New Rochelle from 1955 to 1960
 Vincent Youmans, Broadway composer best known for composing "Tea for Two"
 Alexander von Zemlinsky, Austrian composer, conductor and brother-in-law of Arnold Schoenberg

References

External links

 Village of Larchmont official website
 Larchmont Historical Society
 Larchmont Historical Society Digital Image Archive
 

 
Mamaroneck, New York
Populated coastal places in New York (state)
Villages in New York (state)
Villages in Westchester County, New York